Aburizal Bakrie (born 15 November 1946) is an Indonesian politician and a widely recognised successful businessman in Indonesia. From 2004 until 2005 Bakrie served as Indonesia's Coordinating Minister for Economy. From 2005 until 2009 he served as Coordinating Minister for People's Welfare. Since 2009, Bakrie served as the Chairman of the  Golkar Party up to late 2014, and resumed chairmanship in May 2015.
He is well known to be responsible of the Sidoarjo mud flow via his company Energi Mega Persada.

Early life and education 
Bakrie was born on 15 November 1946 in Jakarta. His father is Achmad Bakrie, the founder of Bakrie & Brothers and Bakrie Group. His mother is Roosniah Nasution. Bakrie is the eldest of four, he has two brothers, Nirwan Bakrie and Indra Usmansyah Bakrie, and a sister Roosniah Odi Bakrie. Bakrie attended the Bandung Institute of Technology where he obtained a degree in electrical engineering in 1973.

Career

Business career
In 1972 Bakrie joined PT Bakrie & Brothers Tbk known today as the Bakrie Group, the conglomerate founded by his late father , which prospered much like the rest of the Indonesian economy during the Soeharto presidency. The Bakrie Group conducts business in agriculture, real estate, trade, shipping, banking, insurance, media, manufacturing, construction, and mining.  Aburizal Bakrie, the eldest of four siblings was the chairman of the family enterprise from 1999 to 2004. In 1998 the Asian economic crisis challenged Bakrie's control of the conglomerate, from which he emerged victorious after a successful refinancing process in 2000.

Public offices
From 1991 to 1995 Bakrie served two consecutive terms as the President of the ASEAN Business Forum and two consecutive terms from 1994 to 2004 as the President of the KADIN. As a member of the Golkar party Bakrie was running to become Golkar's candidate for the presidency in 2004.

Coordinating Minister for Economy
In 2004 Bakrie retired from PT Bakrie & Brothers Tbk before being named Coordinating Minister for Economy. The appointment by President Susilo Bambang Yudhoyono was initially viewed with some reservation. Shortly after being named to the cabinet of Susilo Bambang Yudhoyono, Bakrie set in motion a new government policy calling for a 3% reduction of Indonesians living in poverty, by reducing fuel subsidies in exchange for financial support to approximately 6 million people. Bakrie argued the government's need to gradually increase fuel prices to keep fuel subsidies from busting its budget, while bringing the cost of fuel closer to international levels. By October 2005 and after two price hikes, the cost of fuel increased by 126%. Standard & Poor's rated the hike as an encouraging move to relieve immediate pressure on the country's fiscal position and external balance.

In a move to stem Indonesia's declining output of crude oil, Bakrie weighed in to end a standoff between ExxonMobil Corporation and PT Pertamina. The companies had been at odds for many years, following their dispute over operational and profit sharing issues in the Cepu Block oil fields project, the OPEC member's biggest oil discovery on Java in decades. The previous year Bakrie pledged that the new government wanted to resolve the Cepu and other disputes involving international companies, in a show of its commitment to improving Indonesia's investment climate.

Coordinating Minister for People's Welfare
After a reshuffling of the cabinet in 2005, Bakrie was appointed Coordinating Minister for People's Welfare. In May 2008 Bakrie announced the handout of $1.52 billion to nearly 19 million low income households as part of a direct cash relief program aimed to cushion the blow of the fuel increase.

Chairman of Golkar party
In 2009 Bakrie was elected as the Chairman of Golkar party at Golkar Party Congress in Pekanbaru, Riau, Indonesia after defeating Surya Paloh, Yuddy Chrisnandi and Hutomo Mandala Putra. In May 2010, he successfully formed and was elected the leader of a majority parliamentary coalition with President Susilo Bambang Yudhoyono's party.

Sidoardjo mudflow disaster
Bakrie's name has been mentioned in reference with the Sidoarjo mud flow that erupted on 29 May 2006 in Sidoarjo, a regency of East Java, causing significant devastation to the environment and loss of life. Scientists are divided over the cause that triggered the mud flow. One side is claiming it was a natural occurrence caused by a 6.3-magnitude earthquake that occurred two days earlier near Yogyakarta, while the other side and government confirmed the drilling practices of the PT Lapindo Brantas, a company in which Bakrie's family was a controlling shareholder, triggered the mudflow. The media coverage as a result remains mixed.

Although environmental groups urged Indonesia's government to revoke the drilling license of PT Lapindo Brantas for environmental mismanagement, a three-year police investigation into the incident ended with the case being dropped. According to the Jakarta Globe, Effendi Simbolon, a legislator from the Indonesian Democratic Party of Struggle PDI-P and deputy chairman of House of Representatives Commission VII, which oversees mines and energy affairs, said that "the criticism of Bakrie, whose family controls the company that is widely blamed for the disaster, was unwarranted, politicized and based largely on jealousy."

A 2013 report indicated that for nearly seven years the mudflow had been wreaking havoc in the livelihoods of Porong residents in particular and on the Sidoarjo economy as a whole. The mudflow had also buried more than 6000 hectares of land, displacing 39,700 people and submerging three subdistricts, 12 villages, 11,241 buildings and 362 hectares of rice fields.

Presidential elections 2014
In the fall of 2010 media coverage started to indicate that Bakrie was seeking to become the Golkar Party's presidential candidate in Indonesia's 2014 Presidential election. Since then, Bakrie repeatedly expressed his desire to be nominated as Golkar's presidential candidate. Media reports also suggested the Golkar Party had already commenced its search for a running mate to team up with Bakrie, introducing names like Sri Sultan Hamengkubuwana X the current Governor of Yogyakarta, Pramono Anung the Secretary General of the Indonesian Democratic Party and Deputy House Speaker, Dahlan Iskan the State Enterprises Minister, as well as Edhie Baskoro Yudhoyono the youngest son of Indonesia's current President Susilo Bambang Yudhoyono.

Bakrie's early nomination was met with significant criticism as some party members favoured a caucus to first determine the mechanisms for naming the party's candidate. The head of the Golkar Party advisory board, Akbar Tanjung, criticised the decision earlier in October 2011, when the party congress chose Bakrie as the preferred candidate without allowing other people to be nominated. Tanjung called the process "undemocratic and said it denied other members the right to pursue the nomination". This criticism was echoed by "other members, including some at the regional level". Bakrie responded to the criticism by saying that they were "political attacks" and was described by The Jakarta Post as "shrugging off" the criticism. Others however pointed out the need to settle on their presidential candidate well ahead of the 2014 election, citing Indonesia's sheer geographic footprint with sprawling provinces and a population expected to reach 248 million this year.

On 30 June 2012 at Golkar's Leadership meeting in Bogor, Bakrie was declared the party's 2014 Presidential candidate. In his acceptance speech Bakrie said "Pleading for guidance from God almighty, the faith to build a more developed Indonesia, a strong will and support from all of you, with humility I officially and openly accept this nomination." In an attempt to end speculation about a possible running mate for Bakrie Golkar's Deputy chairman Agung Laksono ruled out the selection of a vice-presidential candidate until 2013.

Recent opinion polls show Bakrie trailing behind other presidential hopefuls including former general Prabowo Subianto (Chief Patron of the Great Indonesia Movement Party) and former President Megawati Sukarnoputri, daughter of Indonesia's first President Sukarno.

See also 
 United Indonesia Cabinet

References

External links 
 Bakrie & Brothers homepage

|-

|-

|-

|-

1946 births
Bandung Institute of Technology alumni
Golkar politicians
Indonesian billionaires
Indonesian businesspeople
Indonesian Muslims
Indonesian socialites
Living people
People from Jakarta
People of Batak descent
Lampung people
Bakrie family